Adelfius I or Adelphius I  was a bishop of Augustoritum (Limoges) in Haute Vienne from . His son, born around the same year, was the father of St Ruricius.

He was the son of Pontius (Paulinus), a nobleman of Burdigala (Bordeaux) born , and Anicia, the daughter of Quintus Clodius Hermogenianus Olybrius, one of the Roman consuls for 379, and his wife Turrenia Anicia Juliana. Adelphius's older brother was named Hermogenianus.

Sources and references
Gregory, Bishop of Tours, Historia Francorum (The History of the Franks) (London, England: Penguin Books, Ltd., 1974).
Ford Mommaerts-Browne, "A Speculation".
Sidonius Apollinaris, The Letters of Sidonius (Oxford: Clarendon, 1915) (orig.), pp. clx-clxxxiii; List of Correspondents, Notes, V.ix.1.

390s births
Year of death unknown
5th-century bishops in Gaul
Bishops of Limoges